Cissus discolor, or the rex begonia vine, is a species of Cissus found in Southeast Asia in China, India, Vietnam, Indonesia, and Thailand at elevations of 600–2000 meters

References

External links
 
 

discolor